The 2021 European  Men's U-19 Handball Championship was the 15th edition of the European Men's U-18 Handball Championship, which was held in Varaždin and Koprivnica, Croatia from 12 to 22 August 2021.

The European Handball Federation has decided to introduce an U-19 European Championship in a move to lessen the COVID-19 pandemic’s impact for national team players born in 2002 and younger.

Qualification

Draw

Preliminary round
All times are local (UTC+2).

Group A

Group B

Group C

Group D

Intermediate round

Group III

Group IV

Main round

Group I

Group II

Final round

Bracket

Championship bracket

Ninth place bracket

Fifth place bracket

13th place bracket

13–16th place semifinals

9–12th place semifinals

5–8th place semifinals

Semifinals

15th place game

13th place game

Eleventh place game

Ninth place game

Seventh place game

Fifth place game

Third place game

Final

Final ranking

Tournament awards 
The all-star team and awards were announced on 22 August 2021.

All-star team

Awards

References

External links 
 Official website
 EHF

European Men's U-18 Handball Championship
European U-19 Handball Championship
International handball competitions hosted by Croatia
European U-19 Handball Championship
European U-19 Handball Championship
European U-19 Handball Championship
Sport in Koprivnica
Sport in Varaždin